Weedpatch (formerly Weed Patch and Alexander's Corner) is an unincorporated community and census-designated place (CDP) in Kern County, California, United States. It is considered to be one of the poorest areas in Kern County. As of the 2010 census it had a population of 2,658.

Geography

History
Although the name "Weed Patch" was applied to the site as early as 1874, the community began only in 1922. The town was also named "Alexander's Corner" in honor of Cal Alexander, a resident.

Weedpatch is the site of the Arvin Federal Government Camp, known colloquially (and in the John Steinbeck novel The Grapes of Wrath) as "Weedpatch Camp". This camp was a government rescue center for distressed migrant workers fleeing the Oklahoma Dust Bowl, during the Great Depression.

Demographics
The 2010 United States Census reported that Weedpatch had a population of 2,658, with a median household income of $28,075 and just above 45.8% living at or below the poverty level. It is considered to have a young population, with a median age of 22.7.

The racial makeup of Weedpatch was 1,212 (45.6%) white, 8 (0.3%) African American, 78 (2.9%) Native American, 14 (0.5%) Asian, 0 (0.0%) Pacific Islander, 1,237 (46.5%) from other races, and 109 (4.1%) from two or more races.  Hispanic or Latino of any race were 2,484 persons (93.5%).

References

Census-designated places in Kern County, California
Populated places established in 1922
Census-designated places in California